The Tripartite Struggle for control of northern India took place in the ninth century, among the Gurjara-Pratihara Empire, the Pala Empire and the Rashtrakuta Empire.

Epigraphist Dineschandra Sircar, however, added a different perspective to this struggle. According to Sircar, the struggle between the Gurjara-Pratihara Empire and the Rashtrakuta Empire had begun earlier than the struggle over Kannauj State. These two powers shared a common frontier in the Gujarat and Malwa regions. The frontier was a shifting one and far from permanent, causing enmity between the two powers. Even before the struggle over Kannauj started, Dantidurga, the founder of the Rashtrakuta Empire, had defeated Nagabhata I of the Gurjara Pratihara dynasty, as evident from the Dashavatara Temple inscription of Dantidurga at Ellora and the Sanjan inscription of Amoghavarsha I, both belonging to the Rashtrakuta dynasty.

On the other hand, the conflict between the Pala Empire of Bengal and Bihar and the Ayudha dynasty of north India was the continuation of an old power struggle that had started between Harshavardhana of the Pushyabhuti dynasty and Sasanka of Gauda in the seventh century and would continue till the twelfth century. These regional struggles were escalated to a greater pitch over the issue of succession of the Ayudha dynasty. Also, the involvement of the four powers, i.e. the Gurjara-Pratihara Empire, the Pala Empire, the Rashtrakuta Empire, and the Ayudha dynasty meant that it was actually a four-power.

Towards the end of the successor of Nagabhata II (of the Gurjara Pratihara dynasty), he successfully attacked Kanauj and established control there. However, the Rastrakutas also formed a matrimonial relationship with the Gangas and defeated the kingdom of Vengi. By the end of the 9th Century, the power of the Rastrakutas started to decline along with the Palas. This was seen as an ideal opportunity by the feudal king Taila II who defeated the Rastrakuta ruler and declared his kingdom there. This came to be known as the Later Chalukya dynasty. Their kingdom included the states of Karnataka, Konkan, and the northern Godavari. By the end of the tripartite struggle, the Pratiharas emerged victoriously and established themselves as the rulers of central India.

History 
Not much is known about the kingdom of the Kannauj after Emperor Harsha's death in 647 AD resulting in great confusion due to the absence of his heirs. Kannauj came for a short period under the hands of Arunasva who attacked Wang Hstian-tse who came to the court of king Harsha as an ambassador of the Chinese emperor Tai-Tsung. However, Wang Hstian-tse succeeded in capturing Arunasva who was taken back to China to spend his days in attendance on the Tang Emperor.

About AD 730, Yashovarman established a kingdom at Kannauj. His invasion of Gauda formed the subject of the Prakrit poem Gaudavaho (Slaying of the king of Gauda), composed by his courtier Vakpatiraja in the 8th century.

After Yashovarman, three kings — Vijrayudha, Indrayudha, and Chakrayudha — ruled over Kannauj between the close of the 8th century until the 820s. Taking advantage of the weakness of these Ayudha rulers and attracted by the immense strategic and economic potentialities of the kingdom of Kannauj, the Gurjara-Pratiharas of Bhinmal (Rajasthan), the Palas of Bengal and Bihar and the Rashtrakutas of the Manyakheta (Karnataka) fought against each other. This tripartite struggle for Kannauj lingered for almost two centuries and ultimately ended in favour of the Gurjara-Pratihara ruler Nagabhata II who made the city the capital of the Gurjara-Pratihara state, which ruled for nearly three centuries.

References 

Military history of India
8th-century conflicts
Natural resource conflicts
9th-century conflicts
10th-century conflicts
Conflicts in India
8th-century establishments in India
Geopolitical rivalry